Funeral for a Friend / Moments in Grace is a split single by Bridgend, Wales, post-hardcore band Funeral for a Friend and St. Augustine, Florida, alternative rock / post-hardcore band Moments in Grace. It was co-released as a clear-colored 7-inch vinyl by Atlantic Records, Salad Days Records, Mighty Atom Records and Infectious Records on April 20, 2004.

The split was released in promotion of an American tour that the two bands shared in April 2004, accompanied by Avenged Sevenfold and My Chemical Romance. Funeral for a Friend's song, "Bullet Theory", was previously released on the band's debut full-length album Casually Dressed & Deep in Conversation, while Moments in Grace's song, "My Dying Day", was scheduled to appear on the band's forthcoming debut full-length album Moonlight Survived. At the time of the split's release, neither song had been officially released in the United States.

Composition and recording 
Moments in Grace's contribution, "My Dying Day", was one of sixteen songs that the band recorded for its full-length album, Moonlight Survived. The album was recorded over the span of two months, from June to August 2003, with producer Brian McTernan at his Salad Days studio in Beltsville, Maryland. Unhappy with the way Moonlight Survived sounded, the band returned to Salad Days in November 2003 to re-record some of the material, record a couple of extra songs, and fully re-mix the release.

Release and packaging 

Funeral for a Friend's "Bullet Theory" had already been released on the band's debut album  Casually Dressed & Deep in Conversation through Mighty Atom Records in the United Kingdom, but had yet to be officially released in the United States.

On the other hand, Moments in Grace's "My Dying Day" had not been released, though it was scheduled to appear on the band's forthcoming debut album Moonlight Survived, originally planned for release in May 2004, but ultimately delayed until August 17, 2004.

The split 7-inch vinyl was co-released through Atlantic Records, Salad Days Records, Mighty Atom Records and Infectious Records, on April 20, 2004. In promotion of the release, webzine Ultimate Guitar held a giveaway contest for five winners to receive a record and a signed poster.

When Moonlight Survived was eventually released, all pre-orders placed through online retailer Smartpunk received a free copy of the split 7-inch vinyl.

Touring 
The split 7-inch vinyl was released in promotion of an American tour shared by Funeral for a Friend and Moments in Grace. At the time, Moments in Grace was on a lengthy six-week tour of the East Coast, South and West Coast of the United States with Avenged Sevenfold, from April 16 to May 24, 2004. The tour also included My Chemical Romance from April 16 to May 14. Funeral for a Friend joined in from April 17–23, following several weeks of shows with Coheed and Cambria.

Track listing 
Credits are adapted from the single's liner notes.

Personnel 
Credits are adapted from the single's liner notes.

Funeral for a Friend 

 Funeral for a Friend
 Matt Davies – lead vocals
 Gareth Davies – bass guitar, backing vocals
 Kris Roberts – guitars
 Darran Smith – guitars
 Ryan Richards – drums, screamed vocals

 Production
 Colin Richardson – recording engineer, mixing engineer and producer at Chapel Studios, Rak Studios and Miloco Studios
 Matt Hyde – recording engineer
 Will Bartle – recording engineer
 Richard Woodcraft – recording engineer
 Funeral for a Friend – co-producer
 Howie Weinberg – mastering engineer at Masterdisk

Moments in Grace 

 Moments in Grace
 Jeremy Griffith – vocals, guitar, keyboards, organ, piano
 Justin Etheridge – guitar
 Jake Brown – bass guitar
 Timothy Kirkpatrick – drums

 Production
 Brian McTernan – recording engineer, mixing engineer and producer at Salad Days
 Pedro Aida – assistant recording engineer at Salad Days
 Matt Squire – Pro Tools engineer at Salad Days
 Michael Barbiero – mixing engineer at Soundtracks
 George Marino – mastering engineer at Sterling Sound
 Shelby Cinca – artwork

References 

2004 singles
Albums produced by Brian McTernan
Atlantic Records singles
Funeral for a Friend albums
Moments in Grace albums
Salad Days Records albums
Split singles